The East Lake Morton Residential District is a U.S. historic district (designated as such on July 9, 1993) located in Lakeland, Florida. The district is bounded by Orange Street, Ingraham Avenue, Palmetto Street, Lake Morton Drive and Massachusetts Avenue. It contains 215 historic buildings.

References

External links
 Polk County listings at National Register of Historic Places

Lakeland, Florida
National Register of Historic Places in Polk County, Florida
Historic districts on the National Register of Historic Places in Florida